Uaru is a small genus of cichlids found in blackwater and whitewater habitats in the upper Orinoco and the Amazon basin.

Etymology
The name Uaru comes from the Amazon word for toad.

Species
There are currently two recognized species in this genus:
 Uaru amphiacanthoides Heckel, 1840 (uaru)
 Uaru fernandezyepezi Stawikowski, 1989

See also
 List of freshwater aquarium fish species

References

 
Heroini
Cichlid genera
Taxa named by Johann Jakob Heckel